General elections were held in Ecuador on 15 October 2006 to elect a new President and National Congress.

As no presidential candidate received a majority of the vote in the first round, a run-off was held on 26 November, which was won by Rafael Correa of the PAIS Alliance.

Noteworthy lack of reporting of null votes
According to the Supreme Electoral Tribunal, the first-round total of null and blank votes was 1,091,833, which is less than the vote for either of the top two candidates.

Run-off 
On November 28, 2006, Correa was declared the winner, although Noboa did not accept defeat, and suggested that he might challenge the validity of the ballot.

According to the Supreme Electoral Tribunal (TSE), out of 97.29% of the votes counted, 57.07% were for Correa and 42.96% for Noboa. Among others, the Organization of American States, US ambassador Linda Jewell, and representatives of many South American countries have recognised Correa as the winner of the election. However, as of November 29, 2006, Álvaro Noboa had still not admitted defeat.

Rafael Correa was duly sworn in as president for a four-year term on January 15, 2007.

Opinion polls

First round

Second round

Results

President

Congress

References

External links
Tribunal Supremo Electoral
Ecuadorian Election 2006 - Election news from Angus Reid Global Monitor
Correa likely to win Ecuador elections, NDTV.com
Ecuador candidate defends Chavez ties, seattlepi.com
Washington frets over 'Bolivarian’ candidate, Green Left Weekly

Presidential elections in Ecuador
Elections in Ecuador
Ecuador
General election
Election and referendum articles with incomplete results
Ecuador